Stari Aerodrom is a neighbourhood in the city of Podgorica that borders the neighborhoods of Ribnica, Vrela Ribnička, Drač and Tuški put. The neighbourhood is located beside an old military airport, Ćemovsko Polje Airport, hence the name "Stari Aerodrom". It is one of three neighbourhoods that comprise the Konik suburb, as well as one of the few neighbourhoods that have seen a large construction boom.

One of Podgorica's prominent hotels, Hotel Kosta's, along with one of Podgorica's main electronic stores, TechnoLux, are in Stari Aerodrom.

The neighbourhood houses the Albanian and Polish embassies to Montenegro, as well as the national Coca-Cola bottling plant, owned by Coca-Cola HBC.

History

2000s construction boom
As the 2006 independence referendum was looming, Stari Aerodrom became among the newest sites of a construction boom as part of Podgorica's everlasting expansion. Many new residential buildings and commercial spaces were built, including Audi and Volkswagen dealerships owned by Rokšped, Dallas Furniture showroom, Okov retailer and VOLI supermarket.

Geography
Stari Aerodrom is bordered to the north by the Fifth Proletarian Brigade Boulevard (Bulevar V Proleterske Brigade) and by the E762 - Tuzi Road / Radomir Ivanović Road (Tuški put / Put Radomira Ivanovića) to the south. To the east is Ćemovsko Polje and to the west railway tracks operated by Railways of Montenegro.

Major streets in Stari Aerodrom include Josip Broz Tito Boulevard (Bulevar Josipa Broza Tita) and Veljko Vlahović Boulevard (Bulevar Veljka Vlahovića).

Culture

Sports

Stari Aerodrom features practice grounds for several of Podgorica's prominent football clubs, including FK Budućnost and FK Mladost. Other practice fields also exist for use by the Football Association of Montenegro.

Education
Pavle Rovinski Elementary School (Osnovna škola „Pavle Rovinski“) is a primary school in Stari Aerodrom.

Demographics
According to the 1991 census, Stari Aerodrom had 5,285 residents.

References

Neighbourhoods of Podgorica